Sashatherina giganteus is a species of freshwater silverside endemic to Lake Lakama in West Papua, Indonesia. This recently described species is the only known member of its genus.

References
 

Craterocephalinae

Freshwater fish of Western New Guinea
Fish described in 2011